The University of Kragujevac Faculty of Agronomy at Čačak, located in Čačak, Serbia, is one of the educational institutions of the University of Kragujevac.

The school's programs cover agronomy, food technology, fruit picking, viticulture, zootechnics and other aspects of the agronomy studies.
The school offers undergraduate studies, Master degree studies, and doctoral studies.

History
The faculty began its operations on 9 October 1978. In 2018, it celebrated its 40-year anniversary.

Notable alumni
 Snežana Bogosavljević Bošković, Serbian politician

References

External links
 

University of Kragujevac
Agronomy schools
Business schools in Serbia
Čačak